The 58th Golden Horse Awards were held on November 27, 2021, at the Sun Yat-sen Memorial Hall in Taipei, Taiwan. Organized by the Taipei Golden Horse Film Festival Executive Committee, the awards honored the best in Chinese-language films of 2020 and 2021.

In the news
Taipei Golden Horse Film Festival Executive Committee chief executive  announced that the Outstanding Taiwanese Filmmaker of the Year Award goes to texture artist Frank Chen, who leads the Frank Creation Co., Ltd. that contributed to nine of the nominated films this year.

During the awards show, Revolution of Our Times has received Best Documentary as both the judges and the audience were praised on this documentary film, awhile the filmmaker Kiwi Chow didn't attend the event that night, concerned for his security issues. Taiwanese president Tsai Ing-wen were also congrats on their win, calling the awards "home to all free artists."

Winners and nominees

References

External links
 Official website of the Golden Horse Awards

58th
2021 film awards
2021 in Taiwan